Maplehurst is a hamlet in the civil parish of Nuthurst, and the Horsham District of West Sussex, England. The hamlet is on the Copsale to Nuthurst road, 3.8 miles (6.2 km) south from the town of Horsham. There is one pub, The White Horse, on Park Lane just off Nuthurst Road.

External links
 

Horsham District
Hamlets in West Sussex